is a castle structure in Shinshiro, Aichi Prefecture, Japan. The castle was built by Takeda Shingen`s general Baba Nobuharu

The castle is now only ruins, some moats and earthworks. The castle was listed as one of the Continued Top 100 Japanese Castles in 2017.

References

Castles in Aichi Prefecture
Ruined castles in Japan
Takeda clan
1570s establishments in Japan
Shinshiro, Aichi